10 Years is a two-disc "best of" album by Banco de Gaia. It was released in 2002.

All the songs are segued into a continuous mix, resulting in each song's track time being shorter than its original version.

Track listing

References

Banco de Gaia compilation albums
2002 greatest hits albums